Howardwick is a city in Donley County, Texas, United States. Its population was 402 at the 2010 census.

Geography

Howardwick is located northwest of the center of Donley County at  (35.033862, –100.909094). It is on the north side of Greenbelt Reservoir, an impoundment on the Salt Fork Red River. Texas State Highway 70 runs past the eastern side of the city, leading south  to Clarendon, the county seat, and north  to Interstate 40.

Demographics

As of the census of 2000,  437 people, 203 households, and 146 families were residing in the city. The population density was 240.6 people/sq mi (92.7/km2). The 430 housing units averaged 236.8/sq mi (91.2/km2). The racial makeup of the city was 97.94% |White, 0.23% African American, 0.69% Native American, 0.23% from other races, and 0.92% from two or more races. Hispanics or Latinos of any race were 4.81% of the population.

Of the 203 households, 15.8% had children under 18 living with them, 66.5% were married couples living together, 3.9% had a female householder with no husband present, and 27.6% were not families. About 25.6% of all households were made up of individuals, and 8.9% had someone living alone who was 65 years of age or older. The average household size was 2.15 and the average family size was 2.51.

In the city, the age distribution was 15.8% under 18, 2.7% from 18 to 24, 14.4% from 25 to 44, 40.7% from 45 to 64, and 26.3% who were 65  or older. The median age was 54 years. For every 100 females, there were 100.5 males. For every 100 females age 18 and over, there were 100.0 males.

The median income for a household in the city was $34,063, and for a family was $38,889. Males had a median income of $25,833 versus $21,563 for females. The per capita income for the city was $16,595. About 11.5% of families and 16.3% of the population were below the poverty line, including 46.2% of those under age 18 and 8.2% of those age 65 or over.

Education
Howardwick is served by the Clarendon Consolidated Independent School District.

References

Cities in Texas
Cities in Donley County, Texas